The 2019 South Norfolk District Council election was held on Thursday 2 May 2019 to elect the whole council as part of 2019 United Kingdom local elections.

Results summary

Ward results

Beck Vale, Dickleburgh & Scole

 
 
 

Martin Wilby was previously the member for Dickleburgh Ward and Clayton Hudson was previously the member for Beck Vale Ward.

Bressingham & Burston

Brooke

Bunwell

Central Wymondham

Cringleford

 
 
 

William Kemp was previously the member for Thurlton Ward elected in 2007 and re-elected in 2011 and 2015

Diss & Roydon

Ditchingham & Earsham

Easton

Forncett

Harleston

 
 
 
 

Brian Riches stood as an Independent having been elected in 2015 as a Conservative.

Hempnall

 
 

Michael Edney was  elected as the Member for Wicklewood Ward in 2011 and 2015

Hethersett

Hingham & Deopham

Loddon & Chedgrave

Mulbarton & Stoke Holy Cross

New Costessey

Newton Flotman

 
 

Florence Ellis was previously the Member for Tasburgh Ward, elected in 2011 and 2015

North Wymondham

Old Costessey

Poringland, Framinghams & Trowse

Rockland

South Wymondham

Stratton

 
 
 
 
 

Desmond Fulcher had been elected in 2015 as a Conservative

Thurlton

Wicklewood

References

2019 English local elections
May 2019 events in the United Kingdom
2019
2010s in Norfolk